The Newark Bay Bridge, officially the Vincent R. Casciano Memorial Bridge, is a steel through arch bridge that is continuous across three spans. It crosses Newark Bay and connects the cities of Newark (in Essex County) and Bayonne (in Hudson County) in New Jersey, United States. It was completed April 4, 1956, as part of the New Jersey Turnpike's Newark Bay (Hudson County) Extension, with a ribbon-cutting ceremony led by Governor of New Jersey Robert B. Meyner.

The bridge is similar in design to the Delaware River–Turnpike Toll Bridge, and is similar in length to the Francis Scott Key Bridge at Baltimore's Outer Harbor. It runs parallel to the earlier built Lehigh Valley Terminal Railway's Upper Bay Bridge.

This bridge is also known as "The Turnpike Bridge" and "The Turnpike Extension Bridge". It carries traffic on a toll regulated section of Interstate 78 along the New Jersey Turnpike to interchanges 14 through 14A. It provides access from the New Jersey Turnpike's main roadway to Hudson County, New Jersey and the Holland Tunnel. The turnpike route creates the border between Bayonne and Jersey City and then runs northward along Port Jersey, Liberty State Park, and Downtown Jersey City. Hoboken is just north of the entrance to Holland Tunnel which continues to  Lower Manhattan in New York City.

From March 2014 until May 2019, during certain hours, the eastbound shoulder of the Turnpike Extension (including the bridge) was opened for normal traffic (by green arrows above, instead of red Xs), for a total of 5 lanes (3 eastbound, 2 westbound). This system was discontinued on May 20, 2019.

There is a long-term capital improvements project to build a new bridge.

See also

 List of bridges, tunnels, and cuts in Hudson County, New Jersey
 CRRNJ Newark Bay Bridge

References
Notes

External links

Newark Bay Bridge Historic Overview

Bridges completed in 1956
Toll bridges in New Jersey
Bridges in Hudson County, New Jersey
Transportation in Bayonne, New Jersey
Tolled sections of Interstate Highways
Interstate 78
Transportation in Newark, New Jersey
New Jersey Turnpike
Continuous truss bridges in the United States
Road bridges in New Jersey
Through arch bridges in the United States
Bridges on the Interstate Highway System
Steel bridges in the United States
1956 establishments in New Jersey